"It's Gonna Be Me" is a song by American boy band NSYNC. It was released through Jive Records, as the second single from their second studio album No Strings Attached (2000) in the United States, and as the third single from the international edition of No Strings Attached. The song was written by Max Martin, Andreas Carlsson, and Rami Yacoub, and produced by the latter. The pop track was inspired by Joe Jackson's "Steppin' Out" (1982) and Rupert Holmes' "Him" (1980), while the lyrics are about a man attempting to persuade a woman to start a new relationship together as she recovers from a previous breakup.

"It's Gonna Be Me" debuted on the US Billboard Hot 100 at number 42, where it eventually peaked at number one for two consecutive weeks. It was the only NSYNC song to peak at the number one position on the Hot 100. The song was certified gold by the Recording Industry Association of America (RIAA) one month after its retail release. "It's Gonna Be Me" also peaked at number one in Canada, and charted in the top 10 on the UK Singles Chart, New Zealand, and Sweden.

An accompanying music video was directed by Wayne Isham, and depicts each NSYNC member as a doll inside a toy store attempting to be bought by a female customer. NSYNC performed the song at the 2000 MTV Movie Awards and 2000 MTV Video Music Awards, and in three headlining concerts. "It's Gonna Be Me" was popularized as an Internet meme titled "It's Gonna Be May", after a Tumblr image of NSYNC member Justin Timberlake was posted in 2012 with the respective caption, which gained the attention of Barack Obama and Timberlake himself.

Background and development
In 1999, Max Martin, Andreas Carlsson, and Rami Yacoub resided in Key West, Florida, to write another single after NSYNC finished recording "Bye Bye Bye" (2000). Carlsson whistled the eventual melody of "It's Gonna Be Me", which caught Martin's attention and subsequently told him to include it in the track. On the weekend of July 17 to 18, 1999, the band recorded vocals for the song in Battery Studios during their break from performing on the NSYNC in Concert tour in New York. They also traveled to Stockholm, Sweden, where they recorded additional vocals in Cheiron Studios.

While "It's Gonna Be Me" was written, Carlsson was inspired by Joe Jackson's "Steppin' Out" (1982) and Rupert Holmes' "Him" (1980). "Steppin' Out" influenced the bassline of the lyric, "You don't want to lose it again, but I'm not like them", while "Him" inspired the song's love triangle theme as well as the title lyric being influenced by the chorus. During recording, Martin consciously wanted the lyrics to be sung in a specific way, which was described by NSYNC member JC Chasez in an interview with Billboard as saying "ET'S GONNA BAY MAY!" instead of "It's gonna be ME". According to Rami, Zomba Group founder Clive Calder additionally told Justin Timberlake to over pronounce the lyric.

Composition
"It's Gonna Be Me" is a pop song, with a funk and R&B influence. According to the sheet music published at Musicnotes.com by Universal Music Publishing Group, it is based on  common time, with a tempo of 82 beats per minute, while composed in the key of C minor. NSYNC's vocal range spans from the low note of F4 to the high note of G5, while the song is constructed in verse–chorus form. Timberlake performs the lead vocals on the song, elongating the word "me" with a "funkadelicized vibrato". Carlsson compared the way Timberlake sung the note to the Backstreet Boys song "It's Gotta Be You" from their 1999 album Millennium, which the opening line "baby" was pronounced as "Bay-bay" instead of "Bay-bee". He opined that Martin's vocal style originated from his time in the Swedish band It's Alive. NSYNC altered the way each consonant and vowel was pronounced in the song in order to provide it with energy. The letter "l" was specifically emphasized on the word "lose" so that the lyric would be sung as "You don't wanna NLUUSE" instead of "You don't wanna lose".

Instrumentation consisted of a whirring electronic drum, funk-sounding bass guitar, bright halting string instruments, and staccato piano notes. The crashing piano stabs were incorporated in order for the beat to sound harder, while synthesizers were used throughout the electronic-based song. Each tense verse consists of beatbox-sounding vocals, which is followed by a slow escalation into an explosive chorus containing several layered vocals. It then shifts to a five-part harmonized bridge, transitioning into the post-chorus, "all that I do, is not enough for you", before concluding with a confetti-falling climax, which follows the song's quiet-loud-quieter-louder structure. The lyrics of "It's Gonna Be Me" describes the scenario of a man attempting to persuade a woman to start a new relationship together so that she could recover from a previous breakup.

Critical reception
Writing for Billboard, Chuck Taylor insisted that "It's Gonna Be Me" was "a finely crafted example of why pop music continues to excel on the top 40 airwaves", stating that the members were able to utilize constructive layers of harmonization on top of an "avalanche of meaty beats". Sputnikmusic emeritus Morrissey described the song as "captivating in its menacing bent". David Browne of Entertainment Weekly was more critical, stating that "they stretch out words like 'babe' into 'bayyyyb', resulting in unintentional parodies of R&B singing". Anna Rahmanan of Consequence of Sound opined that "It's Gonna Be Me" was catchy, but contained "meaningless yet understandable lyrics" in a formulaic song. However, Jim Farber wrote in Entertainment Weekly that it was a "screamybop anthem" that represented the "creative bankruptcy of modern pop".

In 2015, Rolling Stone staff ranked it as the 15th greatest boy band song of all time. They noted how "the lyric juxtaposes the hesitancy of the song's love interest with the determination of an eager-to-please beau represented by both JC Chasez and Justin Timberlake". In a retrospective side-by-side comparison between the then 15th anniversary boy band albums No Strings Attached and Black & Blue, Ariana Bacle of Entertainment Weekly ranked "It's Gonna Be Me" as the second best song behind "The Call" (2000). She stated that it was the "NSYNC discography's real star", claiming that the "relatively simple melody and Justin’s slightly menacing vocals" resulted in "an irresistible three minutes that climaxes with a bridge highlighting the kind of overlapping harmonies that define boy bands". "It's Gonna Be Me" was ranked at number 18 on Billboards The 100 Greatest Songs of 2000 list, stating that it is "the epitome of a song that endures".

Commercial performance
"It's Gonna Be Me" first appeared on the US Top 40 Tracks chart on the May 6, 2000, issue of Billboard at number 33, after it was distributed as a promotional record. It was then released in continental Europe on June 12, 2000. The song was eventually sent to retail stores in the US on July 11, 2000, after it debuted on the Billboard Hot 100 at number 42 the previous week due to early street-date violations. Consequently, this caused "It's Gonna Be Me" to reach number one on the July 29, 2000, issue, scanning 91,000 units. It was the second song released by Jive Records to reach number one since Britney Spears' "...Baby One More Time" in 1999, as they were one of the only singles to be released on CD and cassette formats.

The song remained at number one on the Hot 100 for two consecutive weeks, charting from the July 29–August 5, 2000, dated issues of Billboard. It was the only number one single released by NSYNC, despite six of their singles appearing in the top 10 of the chart. The song also reached number one on the Mainstream Top 40 after spending eight weeks on the chart, dethroning Spears' "Oops!... I Did It Again" (2000). "It's Gonna Be Me" was certified gold by the Recording Industry Association of America (RIAA) on August 11, 2000, for selling 500,000 copies in the US in just a month of its retail release. In Canada, it debuted at number 18 on the RPM Top 100 Singles chart dated June 5, 2000. The song peaked at number one on the July 10, 2000, issue, replacing "Oops!... I Did It Again" which had then spent 11 weeks on the chart.

"It's Gonna Be Me" bowed on the UK Singles Chart at number nine after charting for 12 weeks. It was certified silver by the British Phonographic Industry (BPI) on September 4, 2020, for selling 200,000 equivalent sales units. On the Swedish Sverigetopplistan chart, the song peaked at number six on August 31, 2000, and remained for 10 weeks before receiving a gold certification for sales of 15,000 equivalent units. It reached the top 20 in Italy, Norway, and Scotland. In Australia, "It's Gonna Be Me" debuted at number 15 on the ARIA Singles Chart on June 25, 2000. It peaked at number 11 and charted for 12 weeks, before receiving a platinum certification by the Australian Recording Industry Association (ARIA) for shipping over 70,000 equivalent units. The song peaked at number seven on the New Zealand Singles Chart after charting for 19 weeks, where it was certified gold by Recorded Music NZ (RMNZ) for track-equivalent sales of 5,000 units in the country.

Music video

Background and development
The music video for "It's Gonna Be Me" was directed by Wayne Isham, and filmed from April 26 to 28, 2000, in Los Angeles Center Studios, with additional footage shot at Play Co. Toys on Soledad Canyon Road in Canyon Country, Santa Clarita, California. NSYNC decided to retain the puppet-motif used in their album No Strings Attached by being portrayed as dolls that fight other toys in a toy store. Isham visited Play Co. Toys, which he duplicated by creating multiple shelves on the set that formed a regular shelf. The store was chosen by a production company scouting for stores, as it provided the film crew with more freedom to rearrange and dismantle objects. He decided to bring back model Kim Smith from the "Bye Bye Bye" music video in order for both videos to flow seamlessly with each another.

The music video used limited computer-generated imagery (CGI) as Isham wanted it to appear authentic. Life-sized dominoes were used, which were shot falling across the floor. Initially, Isham pitched the idea for San Francisco-based effects house company Radium to create the dolls by using CGI. However, the company declined, as they would not be able to finish by the requested deadline. Makeup artist Screaming Mad George was hired for the video, which he used prosthetic makeup to transform NSYNC into dolls in six hours. The band kept the makeup on for a 24-hour period, where 22 hours was allocated in shooting the music video. Estee Stanley was also involved with costuming as the video's stylist.

NSYNC were then placed against a green screen at the suggestion of Isham, after he saw a Slim Jim advertisement. The band were filmed at 12 frames per second, on a base of 24, to ensure that they resembled dolls. Consequently, both the song and dancing members needed to perform at half speed due to mathematical problems, which was also attributed to the set scaled 7.2 times larger than the real world. During the scene when the dolls are scanned at the checkout counter and reverted to human size, several shots of each member were superimposed in front of a green screen, which was animated by Radium through the use of Inferno steadily growing each doll back up to human height. The company also assisted in creating digital effects using Inferno, such as the constant "morph zooms" used to transition between scenes. The music video debuted on MTV's Making the Video on May 21, 2000, and also made its first appearance on Total Request Live on May 23, 2000.

Synopsis

The music video begins in a toy store, with the "Bye Bye Bye" introduction faintly playing in the background. Each NSYNC member portrays an animated plastic doll version of themselves, as they are trapped inside of a display box. They punch through the plastic sleeve on their boxes and attempt to gain the attention of a woman in the store so that they can be bought. Army men abseil down from a taller shelf, where they destroy their boxes and goad them into physically fighting. The army men remain standing and laugh at the dolls when they are purchased, giving them a mocking salute at their expense.

The NSYNC dolls notice a group of female dolls and attempt to converse with them, but are rejected and trapped underneath a net thrown onto them in retaliation. The dolls are again teased when the female dolls are scanned. Joey Fatone accidentally knocks down a stack of dominoes forming the band's logo, before the NSYNC dolls frantically run atop the shelf when they notice the same woman walking past their section earlier. They quickly abseil inside the shelf and perform the song's dance choreography for her, quickly gaining her affection for them. She purchases the dolls, and upon being scanned, revert into the life-sized version of each member. The Justin Timberlake doll knocks down the remaining NSYNC dolls behind him on the shelf, as the life-sized members walk out of the toy store alongside the woman. While transitioning throughout the music video, the real-life NSYNC members perform a choreographed dance routine in a domed arena, which contains multi-colored strobe lighting effects constantly alternating the background colors.

Reception
The music video for "It's Gonna Be Me" reached the top position on Total Request Live several times from May to September 2000, which also included the "End of Summer" special and the countdown for the 500th episode. It won Best Makeup in a Music Video at the 10th Annual Music Video Production Association (MVPA) Music Video Awards on May 16, 2001, which was attributed to makeup artists Screaming Mad George and Elan Bonglorno. In addition, it received the awards for Choice Music Video and Choice Summer Song at the 2000 Teen Choice Awards. In 2017, viewership on YouTube garnered five times as many daily views on April 30 as they did in mid-April, seven times as many searches, and 23% more views across all NSYNC music videos, in reference to how Timberlake's lyrics sound like "It's gonna be May". The music video has also consistently received the most traffic on April 30 each year. As of June 2020, it has over 118 million views on YouTube.

Live performances
NSYNC debuted the live performance of "It's Gonna Be Me" at the 2000 MTV Movie Awards, which was described by MTV.com as "mega-explodo". Billboard editor Carla Hay stated that "the tightly choreographed performance" elicited "the most enthusiastic response from the audience". They also performed an uptempo remix of the song at the 2000 MTV Video Music Awards as a medley with "This I Promise You" and "Bye Bye Bye"; the latter included a video-head breakdown with their bodies dancing in time with their heads displayed on the five big screens. Each member performed a quick costume change from the previous song "Bye Bye Bye", wearing leather outfits with few sleeves and a parachute vest. "It's Gonna Be Me" was remixed and re-choreographed with a rap introduction, and included a planned momentary pause from Joey Fatone after pausing halfway through the performance to regain his breath.

NSYNC appeared on several television programs to perform "It's Gonna Be Me", such as Good Morning America, The Rosie O'Donnell Show, and Top of the Pops. While the band were on a Japanese music show, Ultraman appeared onstage with them to strike a pose before they performed the song. During the Super Bowl XXXV halftime show on January 28, 2001, NSYNC performed "It's Gonna Be Me" as part of a back-and-forth medley with Aerosmith. The members wore outfits containing pyrotechnics sparking out from their hands, as Aerosmith lead singer Steven Tyler screamed the last line of the chorus. Adam Graham of The Detroit News wrote that the halftime performance "made a lasting impression" with its blend of teen pop, classic rock, comedy and celebrity cameos in comparison to other performances.

NSYNC performed "It's Gonna Be Me" on the No Strings Attached Tour, which was praised for its production. The song was also included on PopOdyssey, where each band member rode go-karts, shot Nerf guns, and played with several over-sized toys. Five female dancers appeared on the stage littered with giant crayons, blue bouncing balls, scooters and red wagons, while Lance Bass appeared with a stuffed bear attached to him. On the Celebrity Tour, "It's Gonna Be Me" was performed with the song's full dance choreography near the beginning of each concert after "Do Your Thing" and "Bye Bye Bye".

In popular culture
Following the release of the music video, marionettes for each member were created as a reference to their inclusion in the music videos for "Bye Bye Bye" and "It's Gonna Be Me". Each marionette was two feet high and weighs four pounds, and included a certificate signed by the corresponding member.

Throughout "It's Gonna Be Me", Justin Timberlake pronounces the word "me" such that it sounds more like "May," particularly at the conclusion of the song. A Tumblr user first posted an image of Timberlake with the words "It's Gonna Be May" captioned underneath on January 29, 2012. The meme eventually caught on across the internet, which became an annually recurring joke throughout the month of April. It was acknowledged by former United States president Barack Obama, morning television show Good Morning America, and Timberlake himself. The latter explained in an interview that Martin had him pronounce the word to sound like he was from Tennessee. To mark the song's twentieth anniversary in 2020, it was temporarily renamed "It's Gonna Be Me (It's Gonna Be May)" on digital platforms such as Spotify and Apple Music.

American rock band Fall Out Boy released a third music video for their song "Irresistible" on January 5, 2016, which featured American singer Demi Lovato, and was also directed by Isham. It contained cameos from NSYNC members Chris Kirkpatrick as an assembly line worker and Fatone as a toy store employee. On the March 1, 2018, episode of Lip Sync Battle, Puerto Rican singer Luis Fonsi performed a lip sync of "It's Gonna Be Me" while competing against Joan Smalls. He impersonated Timberlake by wearing a blonde curly wig, and performed the song's dance choreography. NSYNC's official Twitter page retweeted the performance among other memes of the song on April 30, 2019, with Christian Allaire of Vogue acknowledging that the band fully embraced the meme. 

American television series Supergirl played "It's Gonna Be Me" in the tenth episode of its fifth season, where critics questioned the song's appropriateness in its accompanying "bar fight" scene. American rock band All Time Low interpolated the chorus of "It's Gonna Be Me" in the song "Clumsy", which is included in their eighth studio album Wake Up, Sunshine (2020). Lead vocalist Alex Gaskarth acknowledged that he accidentally added the "oscillating melody" into the pre-chorus, although he intended to include a pop reference. "It's Gonna Be Me" is used in the first trailer for the computer-animated film Turning Red (2022), which Gizmodo writer Charles Pulliam-Moore opined that the song's inclusion piqued his interest in the film.

Track listings

US limited edition cassette and CD single

US 12-inch single

Remixes maxi single

European CD single

International maxi single

Personnel
Credits adapted from the back cover of "It's Gonna Be Me".

Recording
 Recorded at Cheiron Studios in Stockholm, Sweden, and Battery Studios in New York City, U.S.

Personnel
 Max Martin songwriter
 Rami songwriter, producer
 Andreas Carlsson songwriter
 Chris Trevett recording engineer
 Charles McCrorey assistant engineer
 John Amatiello Pro Tools engineer
 Justin Timberlake human beat box
 Chaz Harper mastering

Charts

Weekly charts

Year-end charts

Certifications

Release history

References

NSYNC songs
2000 singles
2000 songs
Jive Records singles
Billboard Hot 100 number-one singles
Music videos directed by Wayne Isham
Songs written by Max Martin
Songs written by Andreas Carlsson
Songs written by Rami Yacoub
RPM Top Singles number-one singles
Song recordings produced by Rami Yacoub
Internet memes introduced in 2012
Torch songs